Hapalotremus major is a species of tarantula, in the subfamily Theraphosinae. It is native to Peru.

Taxonomy 
Ralph Vary Chamberlin originally described this species as Hemirrhagus major, but it was later transferred to Hapalotremus by Fernando Pérez-Miles & Arturo Locht.

Characteristics 
Hapalotremus major differs from all other species of Hapalotremus by a thinner and more curved embolus, and also its size, which is proportionately large (29 mm).

References 

Endemic fauna of Peru
Theraphosidae
Spiders of South America
Spiders described in 1916